The Madesi tribe (pronounced as Mah-day-see)  are an indigenous group of Native Americans who once thrived in the Big Bend region of the Pit River in northeastern California of the United States, the most down-stream section (AKA the Madesi Valley) of the Pit River (Ajumma) in the Pit River Tribal territory. They are one of nine autonomous bands (also called "tribelets") of the Pit River Tribe who spoke dialects of the Achumawi language or more commonly "Pit River Talk". The other two bands of the Pit River Tribe speak dialects of a second, distinct but related language, called by anthropologists Atsugewi. 
The historic homeland of the other eight bands that share the Achumawi language extended to Goose Lake. On the south side of the  Pit River the Atsugewi language group consisted of two distinct bands (now part of the Pit River Tribe) living in the Hat Creek Valley and Dixie Valley.

References 

Pit River tribes